Steinernema hermaphroditum is a species of  nematodes in the Steinernematidae family.

It was the first steinernematid reported to be able to self fertilize. The species has been classified as androdioecious.

References 

Nematodes
Fauna of Indonesia
Nematodes described in 2004